{{DISPLAYTITLE:C16H16O2}}
The molecular formula C16H16O2 may refer to:

 Dimethylstilbestrol, a nonsteroidal estrogen of the stilbestrol group related to diethylstilbestrol
 Photoanethole, a naturally occurring organic compound that is found in anise and fennel